Sir Charles William Atholl Oakeley, 4th Baronet  (25 October 1828 – 2 November 1915) was an English first-class cricketer and an officer in the Bengal Army.

The son of Sir Herbert Oakeley and Atholl Keturah Murray-Aynsley, he was born at Ealing in October 1828. He was educated at Eton College, succeeding his father as the 4th Baronet while studying at Eton in 1845. From Eton, he went up to Christ Church, Oxford. While studying at Oxford, he made a single appearance in first-class cricket for Oxford University against the Marylebone Cricket Club (MCC) at Lord's in 1848. Batting twice in the match, he scored 7 runs in the Oxford first-innings before he was dismissed by Alfred Diver, while in their second-innings he was run out, having scored a single run. 

After graduating from Oxford, Oakeley served in the Bengal Army in British India, rising to the rank of captain in the Bengal Cavalry. He made a second appearance in first-class cricket, captaining the MCC against Oxford University at Oxford in 1857. Batting twice in the match, he was dismissed for 3 runs in the MCC first-innings by Cloudesley Marsham, while in their second-innings he was unbeaten on 15. He later served as a justice of the peace for Kent. Oakeley was married twice during his life, firstly to Ellen Parsons in 1860, with the marriage lasting until her death in 1895, and secondly to Elizabeth Tuson in 1896. Oakeley died at Tunbridge Wells in November 1915. He was succeeded as the 5th Baronet by his son, Charles.

References

External links

1828 births
1915 deaths
People from Ealing
People educated at Eton College
Alumni of Christ Church, Oxford
English cricketers
Oxford University cricketers
Marylebone Cricket Club cricketers
British Indian Army officers
English justices of the peace
Baronets in the Baronetage of Great Britain